Andreas Tews (born 11 September 1968) is a German former amateur boxer. Tews won the Flyweight Silver medal at the 1988 Summer Olympics and the Featherweight Gold medal at the 1992 Summer Olympics.

His first international success came with his second place in the Flyweight class at the 1986 European Junior Championships held in Copenhagen.   Just one year after that he won the European Senior Championship at Turin.   In the 1991 European Championships at Gothenburg he came in third.

Tews never boxed professionally and is currently a trainer at Gymnasium Rahlstedt in Hamburg, Germany.

Olympic results 
 1988 won the silver medal representing East Germany as a Flyweight at the Seoul Olympics:
Defeated Wang Weiping (China) PTS (5-0)
Defeated Janos Varadi (Hungary) PTS (5-0)
Defeated Benaissa Abed (Algeria) PTS (5-0)
Defeated Mario Gonzalez (Mexico) PTS (5-0)
Lost to Kim Kwang-Sun (South Korea) PTS (1-4)
 1992 won the gold medal representing Germany as a Featherweight at the Barcelona Olympics:
Defeated Kirkor Kirkorov (Bulgaria) PTS (9-5)
Defeated Djamel Lifa (France) PTS (9-4)
Defeated Park Duk-Kyu (South Korea) PTS (17-7)
Defeated Hocine Soltani (Algeria) PTS (11-1)
Defeated Faustino Reyes (Spain) PTS (16-7)

Other accomplishments 
 East German Champion 1985/1987/1989 , German Champion 1991/1992 
 2nd place at Junior European Championships 1986
 European Champion at the 1987 European Amateur Boxing Championships
 Bronze medal at the 1991 European Amateur Boxing Championships

References
 

1968 births
Living people
Boxers at the 1988 Summer Olympics
Boxers at the 1992 Summer Olympics
Olympic boxers of East Germany
Olympic boxers of Germany
Olympic gold medalists for Germany
Olympic silver medalists for East Germany
Sportspeople from Rostock
Olympic medalists in boxing
Medalists at the 1988 Summer Olympics
Medalists at the 1992 Summer Olympics
German male boxers
Recipients of the Patriotic Order of Merit in silver
Featherweight boxers